The 1986 World Mountain Running Championships was the 2nd edition of the global mountain running competition, World Mountain Running Championships, organised by the World Mountain Running Association and was held in Morbegno, Italy on 5 October 1986.

Results

Men individual
Distance 15.0 km, difference in height 1127 m (climb).

Men team

Men short distance

Men short distance team

Men junior individual

Men junior team

Women individual

Women team

References

External links
 World Mountain Running Association official web site

World Mountain Running Championships
World Long Distance Mountain Running